Neil Claassen (born  in Pretoria, South Africa) is a South African rugby union player who last played for the . His regular position is lock or flanker.

Career

Youth and Varsity Cup rugby

He was a member of the Eastern Province side that participated at the Under-16 Grant Khomo Week in 2008. His performance in the tournament also earned him an inclusion in an Under-16 Elite Squad in the same year.

He played for the  side in the 2011 Under-19 Provincial Championship, also captaining the side. He progressed to the  squad and started 25 matches for them during the 2012 and 2013 Under-21 Provincial Championships, also scoring six tries for them during the 2013 competition to make him his side's top try scorer for the competition. This six-try haul also included a brace against eventual champions .

In 2014, he represented Varsity Cup side , scoring three tries in seven starts for the university side.

Free State Cheetahs

Claassen's first class debut came during the 2012 Vodacom Cup competition.

He was included in their Currie Cup squad for the first time prior to the 2014 Currie Cup Premier Division season.

References

South African rugby union players
Living people
1992 births
Rugby union players from Pretoria
Rugby union locks
Rugby union flankers
Free State Cheetahs players